Without Leaving an Address is a 1951 French comedy film directed by Jean-Paul Le Chanois. At the 1st Berlin International Film Festival it won the Golden Bear (Comedies) award. The film's sets were designed by the art directors Max Douy and Serge Piménoff.

Plot
Thérèse has a child but the father left her without leaving an address. She hires taxi driver Émile to find her lover in Paris.

Cast
 Bernard Blier as Émile Gauthier
 Danièle Delorme as Thérèse Ravenaz
 Pierre Trabaud as Gaston
 Arlette Marchal as Madame Forestier
 Pierre Mondy as Forestier's friend
 Juliette Gréco as the singer
 Paul Ville as Victor (the agitated driver)
 Yvette Etiévant as Adrienne Gauthier (Émile's wife)
 Sophie Leclair as Raymonde (Gaston's girl-friend)
 Gérard Oury as  a journalist
 France Roche as Catherine
 Julien Carette as  the craftsman
 Colette Régis as a difficult female customer
 Sylvain as a difficult customer
 Christian Lude as Marcel Forestier (the dentist)
 Louis de Funès as the father-to-be in the waiting room

References

External links

1951 films
1951 comedy films
French comedy films
1950s French-language films
Films directed by Jean-Paul Le Chanois
French black-and-white films
Golden Bear winners
Films produced by Robert Dorfmann
Films scored by Joseph Kosma
1950s French films